Debao is a county of western Guangxi, China. It is under the administration of Baise City.

Economy
Bauxite mining is a major industry in Debao County. To facilitate the transportation of the ore,  a 72-km single-track electrified railway branch was completed in 2010, connecting Debao with Tiandong on the Nanning-Kunming mainline. The bauxite and other local ores are shipped by rail to Qianxinan in Guizhou, Shihezi in Xinjiang, and to other metallurgical plants throughout the country. In the opposite direction, coal is brought to Debao from Guizhou, Shanxi, and from overseas (via the  Fangchenggang port).

There are also plans to extend this new railway further southwest from Debao, to the Longbang border crossing (Jingxi County) on the Vietnamese border.

Administrative divisions
There are 5 towns and 7 townships in the county:

Towns:
Chengguan (城关镇), Longdie (隆桑镇), Jingde (敬德镇), Zurong (足荣镇), Ma'ai (马隘镇)

Townships:
Du'an Township (都安乡), Najia Township (那甲乡), Ronghua Township (荣华乡), Yandong Township (燕峒乡), Longguang Township (龙光乡), Batou Township (巴头乡), Dongling Township (东凌乡)

Climate

Transportation
The county has one railway station, Debao railway station.

References

External links

Counties of Guangxi
Counties and cities in Baise